"(That's What You Do) When You're in Love" is a debut song written by Ken Bell, Terry Skinner and J. L. Wallace, and recorded by American country music group The Forester Sisters.  It was released in January 1985 as the first single from the album The Forester Sisters.  The song reached #10 on the Billboard Hot Country Singles & Tracks chart.

Chart performance

References

1985 songs
1985 debut singles
The Forester Sisters songs
Warner Records singles
Songs written by Terry Skinner
Songs written by Ken Bell (songwriter)
Songs written by J. L. Wallace